This article details Burton Albion F.C.'s 2009–10 season in League Two. This season was Burton's inaugural season in the Football League and saw them finish comfortably in mid-table at 13th, challenging for the play-off places throughout the season.

However, there was little success in other competitions. Despite reaching the second round of the FA Cup, 5–1 defeats against Reading and Chesterfield condemned the Brewers to defeat in the opening rounds of the League Cup and Football League Trophy.

Paul Peschisolido completed his first full season in management alongside assistant Gary Rowett. Shaun Harrad finished as top goalscorer with 22 goals in all competitions, whilst Tony James was awarded the club's Player of the Year.

Players

First-team squad
Squad at end of season

Out on loan

Squad statistics

Goalscorers
As of 8 May 2010. Includes all competitive matches. The list is sorted by shirt number when total goals are equal.

Source: Burton Albion.

Match results

Legend

Pre-season

Coca-Cola League Two

League Two results summary

Results by round

FA Cup

Carling Cup

Johnstone's Paint Trophy

References

Notes

Burton Albion F.C. seasons
Burton Albion